Neel Akasher Chadni is a 2009 Bengali romantic comedy film, directed by Sujit Guha and produced Pijus Saha. The film features Jeet, Koel Mallick, and Jisshu Sengupta in leading roles. It was Jeet and Koel's ninth film. The film won best film in the 2010 Kalakar Awards.

Plot

The plot revolves around the relationship between three characters – Neel (Jisshu Sengupta), Akash (Jeet), and Chandni (Koel Mallick). Neel and Akash are childhood friends. Neel's industrialist father (Ashok Kumar) considers Akash as his son. Akash wants to be a singer, while Neel goes to the United States to complete his MBA. Akash and Chandni fall in love with each other in college, and Neel falls in love with Chandni in an airport. On Chandni's birthday, her father (Arun Bandyopadhyay) announces her engagement with Neel in Akash's presence, who decides to sacrifice his love for his friend. Neel's father, concerned over Akash's feelings for Chandi, sends hitmen to kill Akash. Chandni marries Neel to fulfill her father's wishes, and Neel and Chandni go to North Bengal for their honeymoon. In North Bengal they find Anthony Gomes, who looks similar to Akash. Anthony admits that he is actually Akash and Neel arranges for Chandni and Akash to be married. In the marriage hall, Chandni tells Akash that she loves Neel and can't marry him. Just then, they find out that Neel had been in an accident, and they rush to the hospital. Akash gives his kidney to save Neel and dies.

Cast
 Jeetendra Madnani as Akash
 Jisshu Sengupta as Neel
 Koel Mallick as Chandni
 Ashok Bhattacharya as Neel's father
 Debika Mitra as Neel's mother
 Arun Banerjee as Chadni's father
 Anuradha Roy as Chadni's mother

Soundtrack

References

External links

2009 films
Bengali-language Indian films
Indian romantic comedy films
Films scored by Jeet Ganguly
Bengali remakes of Hindi films
2000s Bengali-language films
2009 romantic comedy films